Carlos Mancheno Cajas (9 October 1902 – 11 October 1996) was President of Ecuador from 23 August 1947 to 2 September 1947. Mancheno assumed control after a coup d'état he led deposed President José María Velasco.  Velasco left the country, returning later both to Ecuador and to the presidency.  Mancheno himself was removed only ten days after taking control, and Velasco's vice-president, Mariano Suárez, assumed the presidency.

External links
 Official Website of the Ecuadorian Government about the country President's History
 Ecuador's Chronology

1902 births
1996 deaths
Presidents of Ecuador
Leaders who took power by coup
People from Riobamba